The 2016 North Carolina Tar Heels football team represented the University of North Carolina at Chapel Hill as a member of Coastal Division of the Atlantic Coast Conference (ACC) during the 2016 NCAA Division I FBS football season. The team was led by fifth-year head coach Larry Fedora and played their home games at Kenan Memorial Stadium. The Tar Heels finished the season 8–5 overall and 5–3 in ACC play to place in a three-way tie for second in the Coastal Division. They were invited to the Sun Bowl, where they lost to Stanford.

Recruiting
National Signing Day was on February 3, 2016 and was the first chance for high school seniors to officially declare which university or college they will be attending for their college career. North Carolina had 26 high school seniors sign a National Letter of Intent to play football with them. Of the class, 7 athletes enrolled early to UNC.

^These signees will not be enrolling at UNC in 2016 due to not being admitted into the school.

Schedule

Personnel
North Carolina head coach Larry Fedora enters his fifth year as the North Carolina's head coach for the 2016 season. At the end of the 2015 season, assistant head coach, Seth Littrell, was hired as the head coach at North Texas.   As a result, co-offensive coordinator and offensive line coach, Chris Kapilovic, was promoted to offensive coordinator, and will retain his role as offensive line coach. Former Tar Heel player, Chad Scott, was hired to replace Littrell as the tight ends/hybrids coach.

Roster

Game summaries

vs. Georgia

at Illinois

James Madison

Pittsburgh

at Florida State

Virginia Tech

at Miami (FL)

at Virginia

Georgia Tech

at Duke

The Citadel

NC State

Stanford–Sun Bowl

Rankings

References

North Carolina
North Carolina Tar Heels football seasons
North Carolina Tar Heels football